Spiramater is a genus of moths of the family Noctuidae.

Species
 Spiramater lutra (Guenée, 1852)

Former species
 Spiramater grandis is now Lacanobia grandis (Guenée, 1852)

References
Natural History Museum Lepidoptera genus database
Spiramater at funet

Hadeninae